Jawahar Navodaya Vidyalaya, Khowai or locally known as JNV R.C. Ghat or JNV Khowai is a boarding, co-educational  school in Khowai district of Tripura state in India. Navodaya Vidyalayas are funded by the Indian Ministry of Human Resources Development and administered  by Navodaya Vidyalaya Smiti, an autonomous body under the ministry.

History 
The school was established in 1988, and is a part of Jawahar Navodaya Vidyalaya schools. This school is administered and monitored by Shillong regional office of Navodaya Vidyalaya Smiti.

Admission 
Admission to JNV Khowai at class VI level is made through selection test conducted by Navodaya Vidyalaya Smiti, which is known as Jawahar Navodaya Vidyalaya Selection Test (JNVST). The information about test is disseminated and advertised in district by the office of Khowai district magistrate (Collector), who is also chairperson of Vidyalaya Management Committee.

Admission period is basically from June to August in every year. 

Both the science and humanities streams are available in class XI and XII 

For smooth functioning of the school, students have been allotted different houses under the care of House Masters/ Mistresses and Associates House Masters/ Mistresses.

Affiliations 
JNV Khowai is affiliated to Central Board of Secondary Education with affiliation number 2040001.

Campus 

 

Mainly situated at Ramchandra Ghat ,Khowai Tripura .

Campus is spread in 30 Acre of land . Separate Hostels are available for boys and girls with proper facilities.

See also 
 List of JNV schools
 Jawahar Navodaya Vidyalaya, North Tripura

References

External links 

 Official Website of JNV Khowai

High schools and secondary schools in Tripura
Khowai
Educational institutions established in 1988
1988 establishments in Tripura
Khowai district